Andy Warhol (1928–1987) was an American artist, film director, and producer.

Andy Warhol may also refer to:

"Andy Warhol" (song), a 1971 song by David Bowie
 “Andy Warhol”, a song by Robbie Williams from Under the Radar Volume 2 
Andy Warhol: A Documentary Film, a 2006 documentary by Ric Burns about Andy Warhol
Andy Warhol Museum of Modern Art, a museum in Slovakia
Andy Warhol Bridge, a bridge in Downtown Pittsburgh, Pennsylvania
The Andy Warhol Museum, a museum on the North Shore of Pittsburgh, Pennsylvania
Andy Warhol Foundation for the Visual Arts
Andy Warhol, a 1965 short film directed by Marie Menken
"Andy Warhol", a song by Little Birdy from the 2004 album BigBigLove
"Andy Warhol", a song by Strung Out from the 2009 album Agents of the Underground
"Andy Warhol", a song by Stereo Total from the 2010 album Baby ouh!
"Andy Warhol (3:59 of Fame)", a song by Evan and Jaron from the 1998 album We've Never Heard of You Either

See also
 
 
 Warhol (disambiguation)
 Andy Warhol Foundation for the Visual Arts, Inc. v. Goldsmith, civil law suite contesting the reuse of copyrighted work